The following is a list of Australians who have attained air marshal rank within the Royal Australian Air Force (RAAF); that is, service personnel who have held the rank of air chief marshal (four-star rank), air marshal (three-star rank) or air vice-marshal (two-star rank). The Royal Australian Air Force was established in 1921 as a separate branch of the Australian military forces. The service was modelled after the Royal Air Force—formed three years earlier—and adopted the same ranking system. Richard Williams, regarded as the "father" of the Royal Australian Air Force, was the service's first member to obtain air-officer rank on being promoted to air commodore (one-star rank) in 1927; he went on to become the first air vice-marshal (1935) and air marshal (1940). In 1965, Sir Frederick Scherger became the first officer to be advanced to air chief marshal, one of only four members of the Royal Australian Air Force to obtain this rank as of June 2014. A further twenty-two individuals have reached air marshal in the RAAF and 137 air vice-marshal; seven officers have retired with the honorary rank of air vice-marshal.

Air chief marshals

The rank of air chief marshal is the most senior rank within the Royal Australian Air Force to which, excluding ceremonial appointments, any officer has ever been promoted. Only the five-star rank of Marshal of the Royal Australian Air Force is higher, but it has been held in only a ceremonial capacity. As there are currently no appointments in the Australian Defence Force (ADF) at the five-star level, there is no prospect of a RAAF officer achieving the rank in a professional (i.e. non-ceremonial) capacity. Additionally, Marshal of the Royal Australian Air Force is generally considered to be a marshal rank as opposed to an air marshal rank and so the only two individuals ever to hold the rank, King George VI and Prince Philip, Duke of Edinburgh, are not listed in a separate section. With the current structure of the ADF, the rank of air chief marshal is held only when an officer of the RAAF is appointed as Chief of the Defence Force. As of June 2018, only four officers have obtained the rank of air chief marshal in the RAAF, the first being Sir Frederick Scherger in 1965 who was also the first non-Army officer in the Australian military to reach four-star rank. Mark Binskin is the most-recently promoted of the four, having been advanced to air chief marshal in June 2014.

Air chief marshals of the Royal Australian Air Force are as follows:

Air marshals

Air marshal is the highest permanent rank in the Royal Australian Air Force. The rank of air marshal is always held by the Chief of Air Force, though is also held when a RAAF officer is appointed as Vice Chief of the Defence Force, Chief of Joint Operations or Chief of Joint Capabilities. Richard Williams was the first officer to attain the rank of air marshal in the RAAF on promotion in 1940. Regarded as the 'father' of the Royal Australian Air Force, Williams was its first and longest serving chief, being appointed to the post during three different periods and serving for a total of thirteen years. Robert Chipman is the most recent officer to obtain the rank of air marshal, having been promoted to the rank in June 2022.

Air marshals of the Royal Australian Air Force are as follows:

Air vice-marshals

The first Royal Australian Air Force air vice-marshal was Richard Williams in 1935; he was followed by Stanley Goble—Williams' successor all three times he held the position of Chief of the Air Staff—two years later. The list of RAAF air vice-marshals includes Frank McNamara, the first Australian aviator to be decorated with the Victoria Cross (VC). McNamara was awarded the VC in 1917 while serving with the Australian Flying Corps, the Australian Army's air branch and predecessor of the RAAF, in the First World War; he was promoted air vice-marshal in 1942. As of January 2023, six women have reached air vice-marshal rank. On promotion to air vice-marshal in 2003, Julie Hammer became the first woman to achieve two-star rank in the ADF. Hammer has since been joined by Margaret Staib (2010), Tracy Smart (2015), Cath Roberts (2016), Barbara Courtney (2021), and Wendy Blyth (2023). 

Air vice-marshals of the Royal Australian Air Force are as follows:

See also

 List of Australian Army generals
 List of Royal Air Force air chief marshals

Notes

References

 
 
 
 
 

Air marshals
Australia
 
Australia
Australia
Australia
Royal Australian Air Force lists